The Icarus F99 Rambo is a Romanian ultralight aircraft, designed by Mr Fendrihan and produced by Romaero S.A of Bucharest under subcontract to the Icarus Foundation, also of Bucharest. The foundation is a sporting and cultural institution that promotes aviation in Romania. The aircraft is supplied as a kit for amateur construction or as a complete ready-to-fly-aircraft.

Design and development
The aircraft was designed to comply with the Romanian microlight rules and also the Canadian AULA rules. It features a strut-braced high-wing, a two-seats-in-side-by-side configuration enclosed cockpit, fixed tricycle landing gear and a single engine in tractor configuration.

The aircraft is made from aluminum sheet. Standard engines available are the  Rotax 912UL and the  Rotax 912ULS four-stroke powerplants.

Specifications (F99 Rambo)

References

External links

Romanian Icarus F99 Rambo video

2000s Romanian ultralight aircraft
Homebuilt aircraft
Single-engined tractor aircraft